"Gwahoddiad" is a Welsh hymn of American origin.

The English words and the tune were written in 1872 by the American Methodist minister and gospel songwriter Lewis Hartsough (1828–1919) during a revival meeting at Epworth, Iowa, where Hartsough was minister. Hartsough was musical editor of The Revivalist, a collection of hymns which had begun in 1868 and continued through 11 editions. The English words with Hartsough's tune first appeared in the 1872 edition.

The tune is in 3/4 time, with fermatas at the option of the songleader. The metrical pattern is 6686 with refrain 5576. The rhyme scheme is abcb; the second and fourth lines rhyme, whether in the verse or in the refrain.

In 1906 the American gospel singer and composer Ira D. Sankey wrote:
The words and music of this beautiful hymn were first published in a monthly entitled Guide to Holiness, a copy of which was sent to me in England. I immediately adopted it, and had it published in Sacred Songs and Solos. It proved to be one of the most helpful of the revival hymns, and was often used as an invitation hymn in England and America. 

The Welsh version  was translated by Calvinistic Methodist minister and musician Ieuan Gwyllt (literally John the Wild, bardic name of John Roberts) (1822–1877). It has become so well known in Wales that, despite its American origin, many people believe it to be an indigenously Welsh hymn.

"I Am Coming, Lord" is an invitation song, typically sung at the end of a sermon in evangelistic meetings. The tune is usually called WELCOME VOICE in American hymnals and may be labeled CALVARY in British hymnals. During World War I Hartsough expressed gratification not only for having heard the song in various languages but also for having learned of its popularity with soldiers in the trenches of Europe.

Consider now the lyrics, with the Welsh version printed first.

Welsh words

The Roberts (Gwyllt) translation has four verses. The first verse is a virtual equivalent of Hartsough's original (see infra). Roberts essentially skipped Hartsough's second verse and then conflated the remaining three verses into similar but not verbatim thoughts matching Welsh to the metrical pattern of Hartsough's tune.

Original English words

"I Am Coming, Lord!" as it appeared in the Revivalist (1872, p. 231, No. 464):

The theology of the fourth verse from Hartsough's original has attracted some clarification from editors. The Calvinist Roberts (Gwyllt) in the Welsh version simply massaged the concerns away via the translation. English-language editors who are unhappy with the theology have sometimes gone the way of B. B. McKinney in simply eliminating the verse
or Elmer Leon Jorgenson in revising it as follows:

American hymn editor William Jensen Reynolds asserted in 1976, as he had done earlier, in 1964, another verse, between the third and fourth verses above:

'Tis Jesus who confirms
The blessed work within,
By adding grace to welcomed grace,
Where reigned the power of sin.

Notable recordings
 Morriston Orpheus Choir, on their 1994 album 60 Years of Song: EMI Records TCPR 133.
 Cerys Matthews, on her 2003 album Cockahoop: Blanco y Negro Records 2564-60306-2
 Only Boys Aloud, on their 2012 self-titled debut album: Relentless Records
 Treorchy Male Choir (1973) The Very Best of Welsh Choirs: 16 Fabulous Tracks, EMI Records: EMC 3099

Notes

1872 songs
American Christian hymns
British songs
Protestant hymns
Songs of World War I
Welsh Christian hymns
Welsh songs
Songs about Jesus
19th-century hymns
Pages using the Score extension